Plantersville was incorporated as a city on May 15, 2017. It is in Grimes County, Texas, United States, at the junction of State Highway 105, Farm Road 1774, and the Atchison, Topeka and Santa Fe Railway in southeast Grimes County. It is adjacent to the city of Todd Mission.

Demographics

Education
Public education in the Plantersville area is provided by the Navasota Independent School District. Navasota High School is its comprehensive high school.

Economy
Since 1974, Plantersville has been home to the Texas Renaissance Festival, an annual event which attracts hundreds of thousands of visitors each year. Over 644,000 visitors were recorded in 2017.

References

External links

Unincorporated communities in Texas
Unincorporated communities in Grimes County, Texas
Populated places established in 2017